Hard Breakers is a 2011 American comedy film directed by Leah Sturgis and starring Sophie Monk, Cameron Richardson, Tom Arnold, Tia Carrere and Chris Kattan.

Cast
Cameron Richardson
Sophie Monk
Tia Carrere
Tom Arnold
Chris Kattan

Release
The film was released in select theaters on May 20, 2011.

Reception
The film has a 14% rating on Rotten Tomatoes.  Paul Schrodt of Slant Magazine awarded the film two stars out of four.

References

External links
 
 

American comedy films
2011 comedy films
2011 films
2010s English-language films
2010s American films